Sandra Spaulding Hughes is a Democratic member of the North Carolina House of Representatives. She has represented the 18th district (New Hanover and Pender counties) since her appointment in April 2008 to replace Thomas E. Wright, who had been expelled.  Hughes was elected to a full term in 2008 and chose not to seek another term in 2010.

Notes

External links
North Carolina General Assembly - Representative Sandra Hughes official NC House website
Campaign website
Project Vote Smart - Representative Sandra Hughes (NC) profile
Follow the Money - Sandra Spaulding Hughes
2008 campaign contributions

Democratic Party members of the North Carolina House of Representatives
Living people
Women state legislators in North Carolina
21st-century American politicians
21st-century American women politicians
Year of birth missing (living people)
African-American state legislators in North Carolina
21st-century African-American women
21st-century African-American politicians